James Edward Heise (October 2, 1930 – April 21, 2011) was a Major League Baseball pitcher.

Heise attended West Virginia University, where he played college baseball for the Mountaineers from 1953–1956.  He was signed by the Washington Senators as an amateur free agent in 1956, and played briefly for the Senators in 1957.

Heise was the son of Clarence Heise, also a Major League Baseball pitcher.

See also
List of second-generation Major League Baseball players

References

External links

1930 births
2011 deaths
Major League Baseball pitchers
Washington Senators (1901–1960) players
Hobbs Sports players
Chattanooga Lookouts players
Midland Indians players
Lamesa Indians players
Charlotte Hornets (baseball) players
Charleston Senators players
Wilson Tobs players
West Virginia Mountaineers baseball players
Baseball players from Pennsylvania
People from Westmoreland County, Pennsylvania